New Socialist Alternative is a Trotskyist political party in India affiliated with the Committee for a Workers' International. It publishes the campaigning newspaper Dudiyora Horaata.

The CWI gained its first Indian supporters after their discussions with the group's executive committee member Peter Taaffe in 1977.

The party is critical of directly equating India's economic growth rate with the welfare of its people, stating that "While there is no denying the fact that India has experienced an exponential growth rate during the nineties, even today over 77% of its population continues to live on Rs.20 a day. If anything, India’s growth story (or more correctly growth terrorism) has come at the expense of its own population, benefiting only the upper classes and a fraction of the middle classes."

New Socialist Alternative actively supports Tamil Solidarity, an international campaign working for the rights of the people of Sri Lanka, and has sought the closure of a camp for the detention of Tamil refugees in the Indian state of Tamil Nadu.

The party has been vocal in its criticism of major sporting events such as the Commonwealth Games and FIFA World Cup being used to channel large amounts of public money into private hands, particularly in countries such as India, South Africa and Brazil, where social programs are minimal and conditions for workers constructing venues and infrastructure are poor.

References

External links
New Socialist Alternative
Committee for a Workers' International

Communist parties in India
India
Trotskyist organisations in India